Denis Epstein (born 2 July 1986) is a German professional footballer who plays for TSG Balingen II.

Career

Youth clubs
Epstein played for three youth clubs, ranging from 1995 to 2005, including the youth teams of Bayer 04 Leverkusen, Fortuna Köln, and 1. FC Köln. In the 1998–99 season, he made a rivalry switch from Bayer Leverkusen to 1. FC Köln. He was picked up as a senior team member for 1. FC Köln II in 2005, playing 31 games for the third division reserve team and scoring three goals.

1. FC Köln
Epstein made his senior debut for 1. FC Köln in the Bundesliga in a 4–1 loss against Hannover 96. He scored his first Bundesliga goal against VfL Wolfsburg after he being substituted on for Dimitrios Grammozis. He ended a seven-game losing streak for the relegation-threatened club. After that, he rarely started a match for Köln, scoring only one goal in the 2006–07 season.

Rot-Weiss Essen
Epstein was loaned out to Rot-Weiss Essen on 20 January 2007 until the end of the 2. Bundesliga season by Köln coach Christoph Daum, to gain more match experience.

Greece
On 24 June 2008, Epstein signed a contract with Iraklis Thessaloniki. He appeared in 24 matches for Iraklis during the 2008–09 season. After another equally successful season (with four goals in 26 appearances), his contract was terminated by mutual consent on 18 June 2010.

In summer 2011, Epstein became the first of Ernesto Valverde's 'unwanted list' at Olympiacos to leave the club, after a year-long loan to Kerkyra. On 18 July 2011, Epstein signed a three-year contract with Atromitos for an undisclosed fee. For the Athenian club, he made  64 appearances scoring 4 goals across all competitions. On 9 April 2013, he terminated his contract with the club.

FSV Frankfurt
In summer 2013, Epstein returned to Germany signing a three-year contract with FSV Frankfurt, returning to the 2. Bundesliga.

Return to Greece
In June 2016, Epstein returned to former PAE Kerkyra having agreed a two-year contract.

On 6 June 2018, after having been released by Kerkyra, he signed a contract with Lamia until the summer of 2020. On 24 September 2018, he scored his first goal for the club in a 2–2 away draw against Panetolikos. On 12 October 2018, he opened the score in an eventual 2–1 away loss against AEK Athens for the Greek Cup. On 20 October 2018, he scored against AEL, completing his team's comeback and helping to a 2–1 away win.

Career statistics

Club

References

External links

1986 births
Living people
Association football midfielders
Association football wingers
German footballers
German expatriate footballers
German expatriate sportspeople in Greece
Bundesliga players
2. Bundesliga players
Super League Greece players
Bayer 04 Leverkusen players
1. FC Köln players
1. FC Köln II players
Rot-Weiss Essen players
Kickers Offenbach players
Iraklis Thessaloniki F.C. players
A.O. Kerkyra players
Atromitos F.C. players
FSV Frankfurt players
PAS Lamia 1964 players
Olympiacos F.C. players
Expatriate footballers in Greece
Germany youth international footballers
Footballers from Cologne